Vox Lux is a 2018 American musical drama film written and directed by Brady Corbet from a story by Corbet and Mona Fastvold. The film stars Natalie Portman, Jude Law, Raffey Cassidy, Stacy Martin and Jennifer Ehle.

Vox Lux had its world premiere at the 75th Venice International Film Festival on September 4, 2018, and was released in the United States on December 7, 2018, by Neon. The film received generally favorable reviews from film critics.

Plot
ACT 1: Genesis

In early January 2000, a boy named Cullen Active walks into his school in the Staten Island neighborhood of New Brighton, goes to an 8th grade class and shoots the teacher, Mrs. Dwyer. One student, 13-year-old Celeste Montgomery, calmly and compassionately talks to Cullen, and offers to pray with him. However, he shoots all the students and kills himself; Celeste is later seen to be in one of only three ambulances carrying survivors from the scene.

As she slowly recovers from her injuries, Celeste and her older sister, Eleanor, write music together. Soon after, at an event led by Father Cliff in memory of the shooting victims, Celeste sings a song that she and Eleanor wrote called "Wrapped Up". The song becomes an instant hit and Celeste is soon picked up by a manager.

By April 2000, Celeste is recording an EP in New York City. Over the next 20 months, Celeste manages and navigates the increasing pressures of her newfound fame in spite of her past trauma. She and Eleanor indulge in bouts of partying that soon get in the way of Celeste's work, including the underage Celeste having a one-night stand with an older musician and Eleanor having sex with Celeste's manager the night before the September 11 attacks. However, we see that Celeste continues to successfully rise in the music industry, with her songs getting quickly picked up by the radio and rushing the demand for her first music video, "Hologram (Smoke and Mirrors)".

ACT 2: Regenesis

In 2017, a terrorist shooting on a beach in Croatia is rumored to be linked to Celeste's music due to the masks that the criminals donned, which are similar to the masks from Celeste's 2001 "Hologram" video.

Celeste is now 31 years old and preparing for the first night of a concert tour for her sixth album, Vox Lux. Her manager informs her of the terrorist shooting, and then tells her to prepare for the ensuing press junkets. Before her first interview, Celeste takes her teenage daughter, Albertine (conceived from the encounter with the musician), to lunch. Once there, Celeste unveils her erratic and destructive behavior, aided by alcohol, resulting in Celeste and Albertine getting kicked out of the restaurant by the manager. It is revealed that, six years prior, Celeste permanently blinded herself in her left eye due to consuming excessive amounts of methanol while binge-drinking household cleaning products. Celeste then drove under the influence across three state lines, injuring a man in his left leg and pelvis in the process, which resulted in a public lawsuit.

After lunch, Celeste has a heated argument with Eleanor after finding out Albertine has recently lost her virginity; Eleanor has been Albertine's guardian since her birth. The press interviews begin soon after, with Celeste becoming increasingly unhinged after one interviewer mentions the aforementioned driving incident. Her publicist decides to cancel the rest of the interviews scheduled that day and asks Celeste to rest before the concert. However, Celeste and her manager get high on drugs and have sex. That evening, an impaired Celeste heads for the concert venue with her entourage in tow. She then experiences a mental breakdown, with Ellie successfully comforting her before sending her out.

FINALE

Celeste appears ready for the concert and preps for the stage with her band and background dancers. She then performs multiple songs with elaborate dance numbers involved. It is revealed that after she was shot, Celeste told Eleanor that she made a deal with the devil for her life. The movie ends with her manager, Albertine, and Eleanor pensively looking on at the façade of a performing Celeste.

Cast

In addition, Willem Dafoe provides the narration.

Production
In August 2016, it was announced Brady Corbet would write and direct the film, with Christine Vachon, David Hinojosa and Brian Young producing the film under their Killer Films and Three Six Zero Group banners respectively. In September 2016, Rooney Mara joined the cast of the film, while Sia was hired to compose original songs for the film. In October 2016, Jude Law joined the cast of the film. In January 2017, Stacy Martin confirmed her involvement in the film. In January 2018, Natalie Portman joined the cast of the film, replacing Mara. In February 2018, Raffey Cassidy joined the cast of the film. In August 2018, it was reported that Sia would be contributing original songs and Scott Walker would be scoring the film. Speaking of his surprise involvement in the film, Willem Dafoe, who narrates the film,  stated that “it was a very last-minute thing. I think Brady had another voice in there and he wasn’t quite happy with it, and at the last minute he had the idea to use me to be the narrator — which in terms of actual work isn’t a huge time commitment. It’s an important tonal element and framing device in the film. It’s a kind of go-between with the audience.” Corbet has discussed the challenges of making the film, saying that "nobody asked for it" and he did not make any money from it.

Principal photography began on February 1, 2018. Portman said her performance was influenced by what she had observed in documentaries on pop stars, such as Madonna and Lady Gaga.

Release
Vox Lux premiered at the 75th Venice International Film Festival on September 4, 2018. It also screened at the 43rd Toronto International Film Festival on September 7, 2018. Shortly after, Neon acquired distribution rights to the film. It was screened at the 29th New Orleans Film Festival on October 23, 2018. It was theatrically released on December 7, 2018 and on VOD by Universal Home Entertainment on March 5, 2019.

Reception

Box office
Vox Lux grossed $0.7 million in the United States and Canada, and $0.7 million in other territories, for a worldwide total of $1.4 million, against a production budget of $11 million. Sales of its DVD/Blu-ray releases cashed $115,195.

Critical response
The website's critical consensus reads: "Intriguing albeit flawed, Vox Lux probes the allures and pitfalls of modern celebrity with sharp intelligence and visual style, all held together by an assured Natalie Portman performance." On Metacritic, the film has a weighted average score of 67 out of 100, based on 39 reviews, indicating "generally favorable reviews".

Guy Lodge of Variety magazine praised Natalie Portman for her performance and called the film "a bold, often brilliant trip through the celebrity spin cycle."

Accolades

Soundtrack

References

External links
 
 
 

2018 films
2018 drama films
2018 independent films
American drama films
American independent films
Films about school violence
Films about singers
Films about terrorism
Films produced by Christine Vachon
Films scored by Scott Walker (singer)
Films set in 1999
Films set in 2000
Films set in 2001
Films set in 2017
Films set in Croatia
Films set in Los Angeles
Films set in Staten Island
Films set in Stockholm
Killer Films films
Bold Films films
Neon (distributor) films
2010s English-language films
2010s American films